Jörg Burger (born 1962) is a German record producer who has had several releases on Kompakt as Triola, including an album, Triola im Fünftonraum, in 2004.  He is also in a duo with Wolfgang Voigt.

References
[ J. Burger AMG Biography]
[ Triola AMG Biography]

External links

German record producers
Living people
1962 births
Date of birth missing (living people)